Pragjyotish College, established in 1954, is one of the oldest, coeducational, postgraduate colleges situated in Guwahati, Assam. This college is affiliated with the Gauhati University.

Departments

Accountancy
Anthropology
 Assamese
 Bengali
 Bodo
Botany
Business Administration
Chemistry
Computer Science
Electronic Commerce
Economics
Education
 English
Finance
Fine Arts
Geography
Geology
Hindi
History
Management
Mathematics
Performing Arts
Philosophy
Physics
Political Science
Sanskrit
Statistics
Tourism Management
Zoology

Courses Available

Undergraduate
Higher Secondary (Science, Commerce, Arts)
B.Sc
B.Com
B.A
B.C.A
B.B.A

Postgraduate
Assamese
Economics
Education
Geography
Geology
Tourism Management
Zoology

References

External links
https://www.pragjyotishcollege.ac.in

Universities and colleges in Guwahati
Colleges affiliated to Gauhati University
Educational institutions established in 1954
1954 establishments in Assam